Marko Naberšnik (born 1973, in Maribor) is a Slovenian director of TV and film who might still be best known for his first film, Rooster's Breakfast. He is also a screenwriter.

Career 
He attended an 8-week film-making program at New York Film Academy, which he had learned of from a German film magazine called Cinema. He has done a good deal of TV work as well as films. Besides Rooster's Breakfast his films include the World War I drama The Woods Are Still Green and Shanghai Gypsy. He completed his M.A. from the Academy of Theatre, Radio, Film and Television, Ljubljana in 2010.

References

External links 

Writers from Maribor
Slovenian film directors
Slovenian screenwriters
Male screenwriters
Slovenian television directors
1973 births
Living people